The prominent post of Bath City Architect was bestowed by the Corporation of Bath, England, on an architect who would be repeatedly chosen for civic projects.  It is a form of council architect.
 Thomas Warr Attwood (unofficially) 1733–1775
 Thomas Baldwin 1780–1792
 John Palmer 1792–1817
 John Lowder 1817–1823 
 George Phillips Manners 1823–1862
 Charles Edward Davis 1862–1902

See also
 Bath City Surveyor
 List of British architects

References

City Architect
Bath City Architect
Architecture lists
1780 establishments in England
Architects